Yang Yuehua (楊月花; born March 1929), née Mao Jinhua, was born in Longyan, Fujian, China with family roots in Xiangtan, Hunan, China. She is the elder daughter of Mao Zedong, (Chairman of the Chinese Communist Party) and He Zizhen (who was his third wife). When she was born in 1929, the Chinese Communist Party was being chased by the Kuomintang army and Mao Zedong decided to leave Longyan and abandon his daughter. She was later adopted by a family surnamed Yang and her name was changed to Yang Yuehua since then.

In 1973, He Minxue, Yang's uncle (He Zizhen's elder brother) met with Yang in Fuzhou and confirmed her identity. However, Yang never met with her parents before their death due to several reasons (It was claimed to be forbidden by Jiang Qing, the fourth wife of Mao Zedong).

References

1929 births
Living people
People from Longyan
Children of national leaders of China
Mao Zedong family